The 2000 Wakefield Metropolitan District Council election took place on 4 May 2000 to elect members of Wakefield Metropolitan District Council in West Yorkshire, England. One third of the council was up for election and the Labour party kept overall control of the council.

After the election, the composition of the council was
Labour 55
Conservative 6
Liberal Democrat 1
Independent 1

Election result

Ward results

References

2000 English local elections
2000
2000s in West Yorkshire